Burden is a surname. Notable people with the surname include:

Alfie Burden, English professional snooker player
Arthur Scott Burden (1879-1921), American equestrian
Barry Burden (born 1971), American political scientist 
Bob Burden, American cartoon artist
Bob Burden (academic), English educational researcher and theorist
Chris Burden, American avant-garde artist
Doug Burden (born 1965), American rower
Francis Burden (1829/30–1882), British chess player
Fred Burden (1852–1897), editor and part-owner South Australian Advertiser newspaper
Harold Nelson Burden (1860–1930), English clergyman and health administrator
Henry Burden, 19th century industrialist
Jane Morris née Jane Burden (1839–1914), English artists' model
John Burden, minister
John Burden (footballer), English footballer
Michael Burden, Dean of New College, Oxford
Nora Burden (1908 – ), Australian stained glass artist
Richard Burden (born 1954), Member of UK parliament
Suzanne Burden, British actor
William Burden, American tenor

See also 
 Burdon (surname)